Onward for Future 4.0 (Korean: 미래를 향한 전진 4.0) was a South Korean political party.

History 
The Onward for Future 4.0 was founded by its president, Lee Un-ju, a former MP of the Bareunmirae Party who was dissatisfied with the leadership of Sohn Hak-kyu.

The party had a pre-inauguration ceremony on 1 December 2019, and announced its flag and logo on 23 December. They announced 44 members including leadership figures, such as Park Hwee-rak (Chief Deputy President), Song Geun-john (Deputy President), Park Ju-won (Secretary-General), Lee Jong-hyuk (General Chairman of the Organising Committee), and Kim Won-sung (Chairman of the Strategic Planning Committee). They also recruited 86 members — 14 for entrepreneurship, economy, labour and renovation, 7 for security and industrial security, 51 for youth startup, and 14 for youth student councils.

On 19 January 2020, the party was officially established. However, after a month, it was merged into the United Future Party.

Ideology and policies 
The party described themselves as centre-right, seeks youth politics and supported freedom and democracy. The name, "Onward", was inspired from the La République En Marche! of France.

The party was also strongly anti-communist. Park Hwee-rak, the Chief Deputy President called the ruling Democratic Party of Korea as "left-wing party who communise the Republic". It wanted to end populist welfare policy while seeking public and labour reform.

4.0 
The party added "4.0" into its name, which means:

 "1.0" - Establishment
 On 15 August 1948, the former President of the Republic Syngman Rhee, and the other heroes and heroines, established this country, and defended freedom and democracy against communism.
 "2.0" - Industrialisation
 From 1960s to 1980s, the country was industrialised by sending troops to South Vietnam, miners and nurses to West Germany, and construction workers to the Middle East.
 "3.0" - Democratisation
 Although the country achieved a democratisation, there were several fakers and hypocrites who endangered the social value and brought a chaotic age.
 "4.0" - Future
 In future, we should end this chaotic age and rebuild a free and fair society.

References

External links
Official website 

2019 establishments in South Korea
2020 disestablishments in South Korea
Anti-communism in South Korea
Anti-communist parties
Conservative parties in South Korea
Defunct conservative parties
Defunct political parties in South Korea
National conservative parties
Political parties disestablished in 2020
Political parties established in 2019
Social conservative parties